James Doyle Bolding, II (November 3, 1949 – July 31, 2011) was an American track and field athlete, primarily known for the 400 metres hurdles.

He was the current world record holder in the now rarely run 440-yard hurdles, the predecessor to the current 400 metre hurdles (the 440 yard event is 2.336m, or seven feet eight inches, longer in distance).

Over the more conventional 400 hurdles, Bolding was ranked in the top ten in the world 5 times from 1972 to 1976, achieving the #1 ranking in 1974 and trailing only the reigning Olympic champion and world record holder John Akii-Bua. In 1974 he was named United States Olympic Committee "Male Athlete of the Year."

Biography
Bolding was born in Tulsa, Oklahoma, and was a 1968 graduate of U. S. Grant High School in Oklahoma City.  He then went to Oklahoma State University where he won two NCAA Championships.  Bolding was 6th at the 1972 Olympic Trials while still in college.  Between Olympics he was the U.S. National Champion in 1973 (440 yard hurdles) and 1974 (400 metres hurdles).  In 1974, on tour, he also won the French national championship.  At the end of the season, he was on the August 1974 cover of Track and Field News captioned "Bolding Burns Barriers."  In the 1976 Olympic Trials, he was in the lead at the halfway point going into a strong wind on the backstretch, but was passed by upstart Edwin Moses around the turn.  Maintaining second until over the last hurdle, he "almost crumpled" and was passed by Mike Shine and a fast closing Quintin Wheeler into a non-qualifying fourth place.  Moses and Shine would finish 1–2 in the Olympics.

Bolding died, aged 61, in Stillwater, Oklahoma.  He is a member of the Oklahoma Sports Hall of Fame.

References

American male hurdlers
1949 births
2011 deaths
Sportspeople from Tulsa, Oklahoma
Oklahoma State University alumni